The Opetiidae or flat-footed flies are members of a family of flies (insects of the Order Diptera). The family contains only five extant species in two genera, Opetia from the Palearctic region and Puyehuemyia from Chile in South America. Several fossil genera have been assigned to the family, but many of these are likely to belong elsewhere in the Platypezoidea. Lonchopterites from the Early Cretaceous Lebanese amber and Electrosania from the Late Cretaceous New Jersey amber seem likely to be closely related to modern opetiids.

Family description

See

Classification
Opetiidae was formerly in Platypezidae.
†Lithopetia Zhang, 1987
†Lithopetia hirsuta Zhang, 1987
Opetia Meigen, 1830 Palearctic, Oligocene-Recent
Opetia aberrans Shatalkin, 1985
Opetia alticola Saigusa, 1963
Opetia anomalipennis Saigusa, 1963
†Opetia atra Statz, 1940 Rott Formation, Germany, Oligocene
Opetia nigra Meigen, 1830
†Opetiala Coram, Jarzembowski & Mostovski, 2000
†Opetiala shatalkini Coram, Jarzembowski & Mostovski, 2000
†Oppenheimiella Meunier, 1893
†Oppenheimiella baltica Meunier, 1893
†Pseudopetia Zhang, 1987
†Pseudopetia exilis Zhang, 1987
†Pseudopetia grandis Zhang, 1987
Puyehuemyia Amorim et al, 2018 Chile, Recent
Puyehuemyia chandleri Amorim et al, 2018

References

Images
Diptera.info

External links

Brachycera families
Platypezoidea
Taxa named by Camillo Rondani